Gollandia, also spelled Gollandiya, (lit. Holland) is a musical group from Russia, who play "semi-acoustic Petersburg alternative [...], mostly blues-oriented", as the band members have defined their own musical style. The band was founded in 2003 as an acoustic duo of singer-songwriter and guitarist Greta and flautist Little. Afterwards the band for some time featured a semi-electric lineup, including bassist Volodya, but without the fleute; nowadays it has been rebooted as an acoustic act featuring permanent frontwoman Greta, solo-guitarist Olga from Ekaterinburg and flautist Sveta from Moscow. The band has participated in a variety of Russian musical festivals – mostly underground (such as Topos, Echo and Spring dripper). It has been extensively touring and performing domestically.

Discography
Я дошёл (I've Come) (2004, JSR at Cheasovshchik studio) 
Contents:
По воде (Walk On The Water) – 3:05
Сказочка Ксюшечке (A Tale For Ksushechka) – 2:32
Не было вечных дорог (There Were No Eternal Paths) – 2:44
Милая (Darling) – 3:34
Не стоит думать (Don't Think That) – 2:57
Знал всегда (I've always known) – 1:59
Северные люди (Nordic People) – 2:14
Иллюзии (Illusions) – 6:04
Дорога (The Road) – 2:23
Весна (Spring) – 2:30
Люби меня (Love Me) – 2:15
Далеко (Far-Away) – 1:48
Вне (Beyond) – 1:34
Скитальцы (Wanderers) – 3:15
Режем по живому (Cutting Living Flesh ) – 2:59
Блюз (Blues) – 2:59
Я дошёл (I've Come) – 3:19
Витрины (Showcases) – 1:56
Эх, я вчера не умерла (Eh, Yesterday I Didn't Die) – 1:16
Ни о чём не промолчу (I'll Conceal Nothing) – 2:34
Наверх (Upwards) – 1:59
Зима (Winter) – 3:07
О невесомости (About Zero Gravity) – 3:09
Дом №2 (House Number 2) – 1:58
Песня про диагноз (Song Of A Diagnosis) – 1:39
Лиза (Lisa) – 1:32
Про смерть мою (On My Death) – 1:43
Не успеть (No Catch ) – 2:10
Я вас полюбил (I've Fallen In Love With You) – 2:47
Скоро я стану (I'm going to become) – 4:18

Grettis' Hits (2006)
Contents:
Матильда – По воде (Walk On The Water)
Владимир Коршунов – Режем по живому (Cutting Living Flesh)
Розенкранц и Гильдерстерн – Дом №2 (House Number 2)
Я-Ха и Уроды – Калейдоскоп (Kaleidoscope)
Владимир Коршунов – Скитальцы (Wanderers)
Матильда – Я дошёл (I've come)
Розенкранц и Гильдерстерн – Автопилот (Autopilot)
Produced by Vladimir Korshunov
Photography by M. Kholodilov, M. Kornilova, E. Yakovleva
Designed by A. Kholodilova
Mastered by Я-Ха
Released amount is 1000 copies.

Videography
House concerts – four videoclips on YouTube (2007)

Reviews
On chelmusic.ru – the first musical information portal of Chelyabinsk region (Russian) 
On tusovok.net (Russian)
from the September number (2006) Perm's magazine "Mirror pages" (Russian) 
On promoteen.com (Russian)

External links
Official site in Russian 
Fan Site on Live Journal in Russian
Unofficial fansite in Russian (mp3)
Unofficial photos in Russian
Links of some materials in u_p_s's LJ
Official forum
Russian rock music groups
Musical groups from Saint Petersburg
Musical groups established in 2003